Gach is a village in Razavi Khorasan Province, Iran.

Gach may also refer to:

 Gach-e Olya, village in Kerman Province, Iran
 Gach-e Sofla, village in Kerman Province, Iran
 Gach (surname)
 GACH (Spanish: , Uruguayan Honorary Scientific Advisory Group formed in response to the COVID-19 pandemic

See also